Bronwyn Bancroft (born 1958) is an Aboriginal Australian artist, and among the first Australian fashion designers invited to show her work in Paris. Born in Tenterfield, New South Wales, and trained in Canberra and Sydney, Bancroft worked as a fashion designer, and is an artist, illustrator, and arts administrator.

In 1985, Bancroft established a shop called Designer Aboriginals, selling fabrics made by Aboriginal artists, including herself. She was a founding member of Boomalli Aboriginal Artists Co-operative. Art work by Bancroft is held by the National Gallery of Australia, the Art Gallery of New South Wales and the Art Gallery of Western Australia. She has provided art work for more than 20 children's books, including Stradbroke Dreamtime by writer and activist Oodgeroo Noonuccal, and books by artist and writer Sally Morgan. She has received design commissions, including one for the exterior of a sports centre in Sydney.

Bancroft has a long history of involvement in community activism and arts administration, and has served as a board member for the National Gallery of Australia. Her painting Prevention of AIDS (1992) was used in a campaign to raise awareness of HIV/AIDS in Australia. Bancroft has served on the boards of copyright collection agency Viscopy, the Australian Society of Authors and Tranby Aboriginal College, and the Artists Board at the Museum of Contemporary Art Australia (MCA) in Sydney.

Early life
A Bundjalung woman, Bancroft was born in Tenterfield, a town in rural New South Wales, in 1958. She was the youngest of seven children of Owen Cecil Joseph Bancroft, known as "Bill"—an Aboriginal Australian from the Djanbun clan—and Dot, who is of Scottish and Polish ancestry. Bancroft has said that her great-great-great-grandmother Pemau was one of only two or three survivors from her clan, the rest murdered when their land was settled by a white farmer. Her grandfather and uncle worked in local goldmines. She recalled that her father's education was obstructed by discrimination because he was Aboriginal. His lack of formal training meant that he had to work away from home cutting railway sleepers, while her mother worked at home as a dressmaker. Bancroft's father was an engineer during World War II, managing barges at Madang and Rabaul.

Following her father's advice on the importance of getting an education or a trade, Bancroft completed high school in Tenterfield before moving to Canberra in 1976 with her husband-to-be Ned Manning, who had also been her teacher. There Bancroft completed a Diploma of Visual Communications through the Canberra School of Art, followed by a Master of Studio Practice and a Master of Visual Arts (Paintings) at the University of Sydney. She never returned to live in Tenterfield, although her three sisters were living there in 2004. Her father died around 1990. Bancroft has three children: Jack was born in 1985, Ella in 1988. She separated from Manning when they were very young; her third child Rubyrose was born in 1999. Jack was awarded NSW Young Australian of the Year in 2010 for his work arranging the mentoring of Indigenous school students.

Career

Art and design
Bancroft was a founding member of the Boomalli Aboriginal Artists Co-operative, one of Australia's oldest Indigenous-run artists' organisations, established in 1987. She served in the roles of chairperson, director, and treasurer during its first two decades. In 1985, she opened a shop in Sydney called Designer Aboriginals, selling the work of designers including her own fabrics, and staffed by her Indigenous female students. Bancroft, Euphemia Bostock and Mini Heath were the first Australian fashion designers invited to show their works in Paris, where Bancroft's painted designs on cloth were exhibited at the 1987 Printemps Fashion Parade. Two years later, in 1989, she contributed to a London exhibition, Australian Fashion: The Contemporary Art. Despite these successes, she moved away from the fashion industry, telling an interviewer in 2005 that she had not done fabric design for 15 years. Described as "an instinctive colourist", Bancroft has since worked primarily as a painter, and has developed "a glowing style reminiscent of stained glass windows". She has cited as influences the American painter Georgia O'Keeffe, European painters Joan Miró, Wassily Kandinsky, and Marc Chagall, and Australian Indigenous artists such as Emily Kngwarreye, Rover Thomas, and Mary MacLean.

Although initially known as a fabric and textile designer, Bancroft has worked with many artistic media, including "jewellery design, painting, collage, illustration, sculpture and interior decoration". Art works by Bancroft are held by the National Gallery of Australia, the Art Gallery of New South Wales, the Art Gallery of Western Australia and the Queensland Art Gallery. The National Gallery holds one of her screenprints, Entrapped, created in 1991. Between 1989 and 2006, Bancroft held eight solo exhibitions and participated in at least 53 group exhibitions, including shows at the Australian Museum in Sydney, the National Gallery of Australia in Canberra, and the National Gallery of Victoria. Her art has been exhibited in Indonesia, New Zealand, the US, France and Germany.

In 2004, Bancroft was commissioned to design a large mural covering the exterior of a sports centre housing two basketball courts at Tempe Reserve in Marrickville, New South Wales. The mural depicts a snake, a man, and a woman, representing both biblical and Indigenous Australian creation stories. It also includes the goanna, the ancestral totem of the Marrickville area's original inhabitants, the Wangal people.

Bancroft ventured into illustrating children's books in 1993, when she provided the artwork for Fat and Juicy Place written by Dianna Kidd. The book was shortlisted for the Children's Book Council of Australia's Book of the Year and won the Australian Multicultural Children's Book Award. In the same year, she illustrated Stradbroke Dreamtime by Indigenous activist and writer Oodgeroo Noonuccal. She was the third artist to have provided images for successive editions of the book, of which the first edition was released in 1972. Bancroft has since contributed artwork for over 20 children's books, including some by prominent Australian writer and artist Sally Morgan, whom she regards as a mentor and friend. These books include Dan's grandpa (1996) and Sam's bush journey (2009). The two artists collaborated on an exhibition of prints at Warrnambool Art Gallery in Victoria in 1991. Researcher and museum curator Margo Neale has described the art of both Bancroft and Morgan as depicting "their relationship to country and family in generally high-keyed works, celebrating and commemorating through personal or collective stories in mainly figurative narratives."

As well as working with established writers, Bancroft has created a number of children's books in her own right, including An Australian 1 2 3 of Animals and An Australian ABC of Animals, which have been favourably reviewed as imaginative and well-illustrated. Her style of illustration has been described as "bold and mysterious", and as "traditional Australian Aboriginal representation rendered in bright, eye-catching colors." In 2009 Bancroft received the Dromkeen Medal for her contribution to children's literature. In May 2010, the Governor-General of Australia Quentin Bryce launched Bancroft's latest book, Why I Love Australia. A long-time supporter of Bancroft's work, Ms Bryce said: "Why I love Australia is a work and title that, again, speaks volumes of its author and illustrator. It simply and exquisitely rejoices in telling a story of this magnificent, sacred land we share: the mountains, rivers and gorges; seas and coral reefs; grasslands and bushlands; saltpans and snow; houses and streets; the jeweled night sky, and so much more."

Bancroft's art has also appeared in the publications of a number of other individuals and organisations, including as cover art for books from the Australian Museum and the New South Wales Education Department, for Larissa Behrendt's novel Home, and for Roberta Sykes's controversial autobiographical narratives Snake Cradle and Snake Dancing, among others.

Administration and activism
Bancroft has been active in arts organisations, and served two terms on the board of the National Gallery of Australia during the 1990s. She was chair of the Visual Arts Board of the New South Wales Ministry for the Arts, and of the National Indigenous Arts Advocacy Organisation from 1993 to 1996. In the lead-up to the 2000 Summer Olympics in Sydney, Bancroft was a member of the design committee that advised on the development of the games' official logo, and has acted as a judge for the $35,000 Country Energy Art Prize. Bancroft was a member of the board of directors of the Australian copyright collection agency, Viscopy, and while serving in that position has been an advocate of resale royalty rights for artists. She has observed that "resale royalties are an intrinsic link to the improvement of the inherent rights of Australian artists to a fair income". She was a member of the Museum of Contemporary Art Australia's Artist Advisory Group in 2005, and is a member of the museum's artists board. She has served on the board of the Indigenous training organisation, Tranby Aboriginal College.

Within and beyond her artistic works, Bancroft has demonstrated concern for a range of social issues, particularly those affecting Indigenous Australians. Her painting Prevention of AIDS (1992) was reproduced on posters and postcards aimed at raising awareness of HIV/AIDS, and was one of several of her images commissioned by the federal Department of Health to highlight issues regarding the disease in the Indigenous community. In 2000, two years after the death of activist Mum (Shirl) Smith, Bancroft and the Boomalli Aboriginal Artists Co-operative organised a fund-raising exhibition of art works in Smith's honour.

As of 2009 Bancroft was a director of the Australian Indigenous Mentoring Experience, a not-for-profit organisation that aims to increase senior high school and university admission rates for Indigenous students. She has taught and mentored Indigenous school students such as Jessica Birk, a winner of the Australia Council's inaugural Emerging and Young Artist Award in May 2009.

In 2021, Bancroft was inaugural recipient of the A$30,000 NSW Aboriginal Creative Fellowship. 

 she is a board member of the Australian Society of Authors.

Selected published works
 Walking the boundaries (illustrator), Angus & Robertson, 1993, 
 Stradbroke dreamtime (illustrator), Angus & Robertson, 1993, 
 Dirrangun (illustrator), Angus & Robertson, 1994, 
 Dan's Grandpa (illustrator), Fremantle Press, 1996, 
 Leaving (illustrator), Roland Harvey, 2000, 
 The Outback (illustrator), with Annaliese Porter, Magabala Books, 2005, 
 An Australian ABC of Animals, Little Hare Books, 2005, 
 Ready to Dream (illustrator), Bloomsbury, 2008, 
 An Australian 1, 2, 3 of animals, Little Hare Books, 2009, 
 W is for wombat: my first Australian word book, Little Hare Books, 2009, 
 Why I love Australia, Little Hare Books, 2010, 
 Colours of Australia, Hardie Grant Egmont, 2016, 742976914
 Shapes of Australia, Little Hare Books, 2017, 
 Clever crow = Wäk L̲iya-Djambatj, Magabala Books, 2018, 
 1, 2, 3 of Australian animals, Little Hare Books, 2019, 
 Coming Home to Country, Little Hare Books, 2020,

Major collections
 Artbank
 Art Gallery of New South Wales
 State Library of New South Wales
 Art Gallery of Western Australia
 Australian Museum
 Department of the Prime Minister and Cabinet (Australia)
 National Gallery of Australia
 National Museum of Australia
 New York Public Library Print Collection
 Newark Museum
 Parliament House Art Collection
 Queensland Art Gallery

See also

 Contemporary Indigenous Australian art

References

External links

 Bronwyn Bancroft's design company
 Bronwyn Bancroft News at the Aboriginal Art Directory
 Examples of Bancroft's art, from an exhibition at Wilson Street Gallery, Sydney, 2010
 

Textile designers
1958 births
Living people
Australian Aboriginal artists
Bundjalung people
Artists from New South Wales
Australian people of Scottish descent
Australian people of Polish descent
People from New England (New South Wales)
20th-century Australian women artists
20th-century Australian artists
21st-century Australian women artists
21st-century Australian artists